Anirudh Prasad Yadav, better known as Sadhu Yadav (born 5 July 1967), is an Indian politician and founder of Garib Janta Dal (Secular). He has served in 14th Lok Sabha as MP of Gopalganj from 2004 to 2009 as Rashtriya Janata Dal (RJD) candidate. Sadhu was MLA of Gopalganj assembly from 2000 to 2004.

Sadhu Yadav is the real brother of Prabhunath Yadav, Subhash Prasad Yadav and Rabri Devi. His sister Rabri is married to Lalu Prasad Yadav, former Railway Minister of India and former Chief Minister of Bihar.

Early life
Sadhu Yadav was born on 5 July 1967 in Salar Kalan village near Mirganj of Gopalganj district, Bihar. His parents are Shiv Prasad Chaudhary and Maharjia Devi.

Sadhu Yadav has 2 brothers Subhash Prasad Yadav and Prabhunath Yadav, and 4 sisters Rabri Devi, Jalebi, Rasgulla and Paan.

Personal life 
Sadhu Yadav is married to Indira Devi since 19 June 1986 and the couple have 1 son and 4 daughters.

His daughter Dr Esha Yadav is married to Rahul Yadav, son of Sheela Yadav. Sheela is the sister of Dharmendra Yadav (former MP of Badaun). His son Aarush Pratap Yadav is a student in Amity Noida.

Political career

1995-2010
As a member of the RJD, Sadhu Yadav was a MLC in Bihar Legislative Council from 1995 to 1997 and 1998 to 2000 and was also MLA of Gopalganj in Bihar Legislative Assembly from 2000 to 2004. He was elected in 14th Lok Sabha as a Member of Parliament (MP) for the Gopalganj Lok Sabha constituency.

He left the RJD after a dispute with his brother-in-law, Lalu Prasad Yadav, related to the allocation of constituencies between RJD and the Lok Janshakti Party (LJP). The Gopalganj constituency had become a reserved seat then and Prakash Jha an LJP candidate, who had lost the election in 2004 from Bettiah, was preferred for the Paschim Champaran seat.

Two days after leaving the RJD, in March 2009, Sadhu Yadav joined the Indian National Congress (INC) and unsuccessfully contested the Paschim Champaran Lok Sabha constituency and lost to Sanjay Jaiswal.

2010-Present
In March 2010 he was briefly suspended from the Indian National Congress for allegedly challenging the party's policy strategy. He denied voicing any such challenge and his explanation was accepted. Returning to the Gopalganj constituency, Yadav then fought and lost as a candidate for the INC in the 2010 Bihar legislative assembly election. That election saw confusion regarding the ages of several candidates, including Yadav. The candidates claimed that errors had resulted in the printing process for pre-election affidavits, and in Yadav's case this meant that he was recorded as aged 47 in 2009 when he had been shown as 44 at the time of the 2004 general elections. When asked for clarification by the BBC in 2009, he claimed to be aged 40.

On 25 March 2014, he announced his candidature for 2014 Lok Sabha elections from Saran contesting against his sister and ex-Chief Minister of Bihar Rabri Devi. He stood as an independent candidate. However, he lost the seat to  BJP candidate Rajiv Pratap Rudy. He finished a distant third from the Barauli assembly seat in 2015 assembly polls by Jan Adhikar Party (Loktantrik). He contested the 2019 Indian general election as a BSP candidate from Maharajganj, but lost to Janardan Singh Sigriwal.

Controversy
The 2003 film Gangaajal, which is based on true events in Bihar and features a politician character called Sadhu Yadav, caused Yadav's supporters to attack cinemas when it was released. Yadav himself attempted to prevent screening of the film, pleading to the court that it belittled him, but Prakash Jha, the director, claimed that "Sadhu Yadav is just a character in the movie. The movie has nothing to do with the profession of politics nor is it a caricature of the Bihar politician."also

References

Living people
People from Bihar
India MPs 2004–2009
Indian National Congress politicians
Rashtriya Janata Dal politicians
Members of the Bihar Legislative Council
Crime in Bihar
Lok Sabha members from Bihar
Yadav family of Bihar
Bahujan Samaj Party politicians from Bihar
1967 births